Loket is a municipality and village in Benešov District in the Central Bohemian Region of the Czech Republic. It has about 600 inhabitants.

Administrative parts
Villages of Alberovice, Bezděkov, Brzotice, Kačerov, Němčice, Radíkovice and Všebořice are administrative parts of Loket.

Notable people
Zdeněk Fibich (1850–1900), composer

References

Villages in Benešov District